Saurida filamentosa, the Threadfin saury, is a species of lizardfish that lives mainly in the Western Pacific.

References
 

Synodontidae
Fish described in 1910